Keli Smith Puzo (born January 25, 1979) is an American field hockey player. Smith Puzo is a two-time Olympian who competed in both the Beijing and London Olympic Games.  At the 2008 Summer Olympics and  2012 Summer Olympics, she competed for the United States women's national field hockey team in the women's event. She grew up and attended grade school in  Selinsgrove, Pennsylvania, and attended the University of Maryland, where she played for the Terrapins.

References

External links
 

American female field hockey players
1979 births
Living people
Maryland Terrapins field hockey players
Olympic field hockey players of the United States
Field hockey players at the 2008 Summer Olympics
Field hockey players at the 2012 Summer Olympics
People from Selinsgrove, Pennsylvania